The women's javelin throw event at the 1997 Summer Universiade was held at the Stadio Cibali in Catania, Italy on 30 August. This was the last edition to feature the old model of javelin.

Results

References

Athletics at the 1997 Summer Universiade
1997 in women's athletics
1997